In military terms, 102nd Regiment may refer to:

Infantry regiments
 102nd Infantry Regiment (Imperial Japanese Army)
 102nd Infantry Regiment (France)
 102nd Infantry Regiment (United States)
 102nd Indiana Infantry Regiment, of the Union Army
 102nd Regiment United States Colored Troops, of the Union Army
 102nd Regiment of Foot (Royal Madras Fusiliers), originally raised by the British East India Company and absorbed by the British Army in 1862
 102nd Regiment of Foot (Irish Rangers), of the British Army (1793-1795)
 102nd Regiment of Foot, or New South Wales Corps, of the British Army (1789–1810)
 102nd Regiment, Rocky Mountain Rangers, now The Rocky Mountain Rangers
 102nd Grenadier Regiment, part of the 24th Infantry Division (Wehrmacht)

Artillery regiments
 102nd (Pembroke Yeomanry) Medium Regiment, Royal Artillery

Aviation regiments
 102nd Regiment, part of the 34th Transport Division (China)

Cavalry regiments
 102nd Cavalry Regiment, of the United States Army
 102nd Cavalry Regiment, part of the 36th Cavalry Division (Soviet Union)